Namibia is divided into 14 regions subdivided, which are further subdivided into 121 constituencies. The administrative divisions of Namibia are tabled by Delimitation Commissions and accepted or declined by the National Assembly.

History
Before the independence of Namibia, the territory was known as South-West Africa (before 1885 and between 1915 and 1989) and as German South-West Africa during the time of colonialisation by the German Empire (1885-1915).

During the South African administration it was considered the de facto fifth province of South Africa, although a formal request for annexation to the United Nations was turned down. The territory that became the independent state of Namibia on 21 March 1990 inherited the administrative division of this "province" which consisted of 26 districts. These districts remained until the First Delimitation Commission of Namibia tabled its recommendations in the National Assembly, and the latter approved and implemented them in 1992. Since then, Namibia is divided into regions which in turn are divided into constituencies.

Delimitation Commissions
Delimitation Commissions are three-member bodies appointed by the president that make suggestions as to how Namibia should be administratively divided, considering only geographical changes like population grow and migration but not discriminating by ethnic factors. They are mentioned in articles 102-104 of the constitution, and they are to sit approximately once every ten years, although they sat more frequently before 2002.

The chairman of the Delimitation Commission must be a judge at either a High Court or the Supreme Court. This judge and the other two commission members are appointed by the president, subject to the approval of Parliament.

The four Delimitation Commissions of Namibia so far are:

Current administrative division

The current administrative division of Namibia is the result of the work of the Fourth Delimitation Commission, tabled in 2013. Namibia is divided into 14 regions and 121 constituencies.

References 

Politics of Namibia
Subdivisions of Namibia